Reems Creek is a stream in the U.S. state of North Carolina. It is a tributary to the French Broad River.

According to tradition, the creek derives its name from one Mr. Rims, a pioneer who was killed by Indians near its mouth. Variant names are "Reams Creek", "Reem Creek", "Rheims Creek", and "Rims Creek".

References

Rivers of North Carolina
Rivers of Buncombe County, North Carolina